NGC 188 (also known as Caldwell 1) is an open cluster in the constellation Cepheus. It was discovered by John Herschel in 1825.
Unlike most open clusters that drift apart after a few million years because of the gravitational interaction of our Milky Way galaxy, NGC 188 lies far above the plane of the galaxy and is one of the most ancient of open clusters known, at approximately 6.8 billion years old. NGC 188 is very close to the North Celestial Pole, under five degrees away, and in the constellation of Cepheus at an estimated 5,000 light-years' distance, this puts it slightly above the Milky Way's disc and further from the center of the galaxy than the Sun.

References

External links
 
 NGC 188 at SEDS NGC objects pages
 NGC 188 at NightSkyInfo.com
 
 

NGC 0188
NGC 0188
0188
001b
Astronomical objects discovered in 1825